Richard Dourthe (born 13 December 1974 in Dax) is a retired French international rugby union player.

He is the son of Claude Dourthe (to date, the youngest ever French international rugby union player) and both Raphaël Ibañez and Olivier Magne's brother-in-law (their being married to his sisters).

He won 31 caps for France between 1995 to 2001, scoring 3 tries and 32 penalties, 183 points on aggregate. He played at the 1999 Rugby World Cup.

External links 
lequipe.fr
Profile on French federation official site
www.scrum.com
www.ercrugby.co

1974 births
Living people
People from Dax, Landes
French rugby union players
Stade Français players
Rugby union centres
France international rugby union players
US Dax coaches
Sportspeople from Landes (department)
CA Bordeaux-Bègles Gironde players
Aviron Bayonnais players
AS Béziers Hérault players
Castres Olympique players